Shrinathji Temple is a Hindu temple dedicated to Shrinathji in Nathdwara. It is considered an important pilgrimage centre by Vaishnavas.

Legend and history

The Swarup or divine form of Shrinathji is said to be self-manifested. The deity of the Lord Krishna according to the legend, is self-manifested from stone and emerged from the Govardhan Hills. Historically, the image of Shrinathji was first worshipped at Govardhan hill, near Mathura. The image was initially shifted from Mathura in 1672 CE along river Yamuna and was retained at Agra for almost six months, in order to safeguard it from the Mughal ruler Aurangzeb, who wished to keep the prestigious deity with him in Agra. Subsequently, the image was transferred further south on a chariot to a safer place to protect it from barbaric destruction unleashed by the Mughal ruler Aurangzeb. When the deity reached the spot at village Sihad or Sinhad, the wheels of the bullock cart in which the deity was being transported sank axle-deep in mud and could not be moved any farther. The accompanying priests realised that the particular place was the Lord's chosen spot and accordingly, a temple was built there under the rule and protection of the then Maharana Raj Singh of Mewar. Shrinathji Temple is also known as 'Haveli of Shrinathji’ (mansion). The temple was built by Goswami Damodar Das Bairagi in 1672.

Holkar's attack and Shrinathji's rescue by Maharana
In 1802, Jaswant Rao Holkar moved to Mewar after being defeated by Daulat Rao Sindhia and advanced towards Nathdwara to plunder the town and the temple. News of Holkar's march was already received in Nathdwara and Goswamiji requested Maharana Bhim Singh for help. Maharana sent an escort of Thakurs of Delwara, Kunthwa, Argya, Mohi, Kothariya to escort the deity to Udaipur. Goswamiji reached Udaipur with the image of Shrinathji, NavinPriyaJi and VitthalNathJi on 29th Jan, 1802.  At Unawas, Thakur Vijay Singh of Kothariya and his men fought with Holkar's army and were killed in the battle. Holkar's army soon reached Nathdwara. Holkar's men first plundered the town mercilessly and then demanded 10 Lakh rupees. With the mediation of Seth Balachand, the amount was brought down to the immediate payment of 1 Lakh. Singhvi Motichand was sent to negotiate further, but Holkar arrested him, broke the locks of the temple and looted the treasure and valuables of the temple. Holkar's army then plundered not the just the town of Nathdwara but the entire district and marched to Banera.

Later, Shrinathji temple at Ghasiyar was built, where the deity was shifted from Udaipur. After a few years, the deity was moved back to Nathdwara. Temple of Shrinathji at Ghasiyar is still open. 

In 1934  an order was issued by the Udaipur King (Darbar), by which, inter alia, it was declared that according  to the law of Udaipur all the property dedicated or presented to or otherwise coming to the Deity Shrinathji was the property of the shrine, that the Tilkayat Maharaj for the time being was merely a custodian, Manager and Trustee of the said property and that the Udaipur Darbar had absolute right to supervise that the 562 property dedicated to the shrine was used for the legitimate purposes of the shrine.

Legend
According to the hagiography of the Pushtimarg, Shrinathji used to travel to Mewar to play chaupar (an antecedent to Parcheesi) with a Princess by the name of Ajab Kunvari. She was upset whenever her beloved Shrinathji would go back to Vraj and asked him to stay with her in the palace. Lord Shrinathji said that one day, when the time was right, he would re-locate to Rajasthan.

Presently, Shrinathji's worship is performed by direct male descendants of Vallabhacharya in a haveli (lit. palatial home) in Nathdwara, Rajasthan.

Economy and livelihoods in Nathdwara town revolve around the Haveli, the term used for the temple probably because it was situated in a fortified mansion, or Haveli, once a royal palace of the Sesodia Rajput rulers of Mewar.

Shrinathji was quite popular with other medieval devotees, as well, as there were preachers who founded Shrinathji temples in present-day Pakistan (Dera Ghazi Khan). This was done by Shri Lal Maharaj Ji and his deity of Shri Gopi Nath Ji and Shri Dau Ji of Dera Ghazi Khan, earlier a part of undivided India and not far from here. Shrinathji was even worshiped as far away as Russia (in the lower Volga region) and other places on the Central Asian trade routes.

Structure and design 
The temple has been designed in the lines of  Nanda Maharaj (Krishna's father) temple, in Vrindavan. Therefore, it is also known as Nanda Bhavan or Nandalaya (the House of Nanda).

Structurally, a kalasha on the shikhara marks the top of the temple, on which seven flags are flown along with the Sudarshana Chakra. The seven flags represent the 7 'houses' of Pushti Marg or Vallabh Sampradaya. The temple is also popularly called Shrinathji ki Haveli (House of Shrinathji). With the mood of worship in Pushti Marg, Shrinathji is not seen as an impersonal God so the worship is not done like in a temple. Shrinathji is seen as Thakorji or Lord of the House or Haveli and Sewa (service) is offered rather than worship. Like a regular household it has a chariot for movement (In fact the original chariot in which Shrinathji was brought to Singhar), a storeroom for milk (Doodhghar), a storeroom for betel (Paanghar), a storeroom for sugar and sweetmeats (Mishrighar and Pedaghar), a storeroom for flowers (Phoolghar), a functional kitchen (Rasoighar), a jewellery chamber (Gahnaghar), a treasury (Kharcha bhandaar), a stable for horses of chariot (Ashvashala), a drawing room (Baithak), a gold and silver grinding wheel (Chakki).

The Nathdwara temple has subsidiary temples dedicated to the deity Madan Mohanji and Navneet Priyaji, located in the main complex.

Image of Shrinathji
Shrinathji symbolizes a form of Krishna, when he lifted the Govardhan hill, with one arm raised. The image is in the form of a single black marble, where the lord is revealed with his left hand raised and the right hand made into a fist resting at the waist, with a large diamond placed beneath the lips.
The deity is carved in bas-relief out of a monolithic black marble stone, with images of two cows, one lion, one snake, two peacocks and one parrot engraved on it and three sages placed near it.

The iconography at the temple has given birth to Nathdwara Paintings.

Festivals and rituals 
Devotees throng to the shrine in large numbers during occasions of Janmashtami and other festivals, like Holi and Diwali. The deity is treated like a living image, and is attended with daily normal functions, like bathing, dressing, meals called "bhog" and the resting times in regular intervals. Since the deity is believed to be the infant Krishna, accordingly, special care is taken. The priests in all Havelis are Brahmins under Gurus who are the kul (descendants) of Vallabhacharya, the founder of this deity's image at Govardhan hill, near Mathura.

The main attractions are the Aartis and the Shringar, i.e. the dressing and beautifying of the deity of Shrinathji, which is changed seven times daily, treating it as a living person, adorning it with the appropriate dresses for the time of day or night. The intricately woven shaneels and silk cloth have original zari and embroidery work on them, along with large quantities of real precious jewellery. The formal prayers are offered with diya, incense sticks, flowers, fruit and other offerings, with local instruments and devotional songs of the Shrinathji, according to the demand of the time and occasion.  The view of the deity after the parda (curtain) is removed is called jhakhi.

Coronavirus Effect 
Due to Coronavirus disease 2019, authorities have decided to reduce "Darshan Timings" to 4 times from 8 times. They also decided to allow only 50 people at once for Darshan.

See also
Shrinathji Temple, Bahrain

References

External links
Official website
Shrinathji temple complete info
Shrinathji Temple

Hindu temples in Rajasthan
Tourist attractions in Rajsamand district
Krishna
Nathdwara